Radishchevsky District  is an administrative and municipal district (raion), one of the twenty-one in Ulyanovsk Oblast, Russia. It is located in the south of the oblast. Its administrative center is the urban locality (a work settlement) of Radishchevo. Population: 14,284 (2010 Census);  The population of Radishchevo accounts for 32.2% of the district's total population.

References

Notes

Sources

Districts of Ulyanovsk Oblast